Lulu Xuan (born 15 January 1991) is a Chinese actress. She debuted in the television series The Dream of Red Mansions  (2010). She is best known for portraying Lanman Shandi in the historical television series Legend of SouthWest Dance and Music (2013) and Jiang Yanli in the xianxia web series The Untamed (2019). She rose to fame with her lead role in Well-Dominated Love.

Filmography

Film

Television series

Television show

Discography

References

1991 births
Living people
Actresses from Nanjing
21st-century Chinese actresses
Chinese television actresses
Beijing Dance Academy alumni
Central Academy of Drama alumni